Gianfranco Baldazzi (28 July 1943 – 25 June 2013) was an Italian lyricist, record producer, author and journalist.

Life and career 
Born in Bologna, Baldazzi started his career as a stage actor. Active from the second half of the 1960s, he wrote songs for Mina, Lucio Dalla, Gianni Morandi, Ornella Vanoni, Peppino di Capri, Ron among others. He was also a producer, and between 1991 and 1994 he was artistic director of the label Pressing. As an author, Baldazzi wrote several books about Italian music history, some biographies and a historical novel set in the Middle Ages, "Il Silenzio della Cattedrale" (The Silence of the Cathedral). He also collaborated with several magazines and newspapers, and with the TV-channel RAI International.

Publications 
 La canzone italiana del Novecento (Newton Compton, 1988), a history of Italian Song from Enrico Caruso to Eros Ramazzotti
 I nostri cantautori (Thema, prima edizione 1990), a history of Art Song in Italy from Odoardo Spadaro to the present day
 Dalla (Muzio, prima edizione 1990), a biography of singer-songwriter Lucio Dalla, told by a friend from his same hometown
 Le parole che cantavamo (50&PIÙ, Le Perle della Memoria, 2004)
 Lucio Dalla. L'uomo degli specchi (Minerva Edizioni, 2013) with photos by Roberto Serra

Songs written by Gianfranco Baldazzi

References

External links 
 Gianfranco Baldazzi at Discogs

1943 births
2013 deaths
Musicians from Bologna
Italian lyricists
Italian record producers
20th-century Italian musicians
20th-century Italian male musicians
Writers from Bologna